The English International School of Moscow is a selective British international school in Moscow, Russia. It was founded in 2006 by the Orbital Education team led by Kevin McNeany, who previously founded Nord Anglia group. The founding headmaster was Mr Trevor Wilson.

The first campus is located in Novogireyevo District in the East of Moscow. Pupils aged 3–18 follow a modified version of the English National Curriculum which leads to the International General Certificate of Secondary Education (IGCSE), followed by Advanced (A) Level (university entrance) examinations for 16- to 18-year-old students. The school as an examination centre for Edexcel and Cambridge University. In addition it is a full member of the Council of International Schools (CIS).

The second EISM campus was opened in September 2012 in the West of Moscow at Molodogvardeyskaya, near Kutuzovskiy Prospect.
Pupils, aged 3–12 years old, learn multiple subjects through the modified English National Curriculum.

The third campus was scheduled to open in September 2014 to be opened near the Leninsky Avenue (Leninsky Prospekt) for pupils aged 3–11 years old

Student body 
The school had 35 students when it opened. As of 2010 the school had 150 students.

See also 

 Russian Embassy School in London – Russian school in London

References 

British international schools in Russia
International schools in Moscow
Cambridge schools in Russia
Educational institutions established in 2006
2006 establishments in Russia